Wanasthana Sajakul, also known as Big Hoy (former name: Thawatchai Sajakul) is a Thai politician and former member of parliament, former manager for the Thailand national football team from 1993 to 1996, and manager of Thailand Premier League side Chula-Sinthana FC. He has led the side to the Thailand Division 1 League, Group B title in 2007 and the Thailand Division 2 League title in 2006.

Honours
As manager

International
1993 SEA Games - Thailand
 1994 King's Cup - Thailand B (Dream Team)
1995 SEA Games - Thailand
1996 Tiger Cup - Thailand
1997 SEA Games - Thailand

Club
Thailand Division 1 League Champions : 2007 with Chula-Sinthana FC - Group B
Thailand Division 2 League Champions: 2006 with Chula-Sinthana FC

References

Living people
Wanasthana Sajakul
Thailand national football team managers
Wanasthana Sajakul
1943 births
Wanasthana Sajakul
Wanasthana Sajakul